Paolo Bettini (born 1 April 1974 in Cecina, Livorno, Tuscany) is an Italian former champion road racing cyclist, and the former coach of the Italian national cycling team. Considered the best classics specialist of his generation, and probably one of the strongest of all times, he won gold medals in the 2004 Athens Olympics road race and in the 2006 and 2007 World Road Race Championships. He is nicknamed Il Grillo ("the cricket") for his repeated sudden attacks and his sprinting style.

He gained prominence by winning Liège–Bastogne–Liège in 2000 and 2002. He set the record for World Cup wins in a season in 2003, winning the Milan–San Remo, HEW Cyclassics and Clásica de San Sebastián. He won the Giro di Lombardia in 2005 and 2006, the Züri-Metzgete in 2001 and 2005 and Tirreno–Adriatico in 2004.

Early career
Paolo Bettini lived with his family on the Tuscany coast. He began racing when he was seven and won 23 of his first 24 races. His first bike had a secondhand frame which his father, Giuliano, had painted orange. The components were cannibalised from other bikes. He started racing after the encouragement of his brother.

He came fourth in the world under-23 road championship in 1996, behind three other Italians, Giuliano Fugeras, Roberti Sgambelluri and Luca Sironi. He turned professional the following year for the MG-Technogym team. There he rode as domestique to Michele Bartoli, "a working class cyclist", wrote Stephen Farrand, "destined to work for others to earn his crust." He worked for Bartoli, who in return helped with advice. Bartoli won the World Cup in 1997 and 1998 with Bettini's help.

Bartoli fell heavily on a knee in 1999 and Bettini was freed to race for himself. He won Liège–Bastogne–Liège in 2000 – treating himself to a €100,000 Porsche – and a flat stage of that year's Tour de France, from Agen to Dax. He won the 2001 Züri-Metzgete after a few months without wins, beating Jan Ullrich in the sprint to the finish. His success led to a feud with Bartoli. It culminated in the 2001 world championship in Lisbon, Portugal, where Bartoli refused to lead Bettini to a flying start in the sprint finish and the Spaniard, Óscar Freire, won instead.

2002 World Cup and race season
The 2002 season was a breakthrough. In the World Cup, Bettini was caught in the final kilometers of Milan–San Remo.  After his 1–2 win with Stefano Garzelli in Liège–Bastogne–Liège, Bettini ran neck-to-neck against Museeuw, who won Paris–Roubaix in a 50 km solo breakaway, and the HEW Cyclassics.  A tactical ride in Giro di Lombardia earned Bettini the World Cup.

Bettini played strong support in Mario Cipollini's victory in the UCI Road Cycling World Championship in Zolder, Belgium.

2003 World Cup and race season
The 2003 World Cup series started with Milan–San Remo.  Attacking twice in the last hills leading down to the Primavera, Bettini had the help of Luca Paolini, who attacked down the tricky descent towards the finish.

However, injury in the Gent–Wevelgem forced Bettini to miss several races until the Tour de France in July.  He then followed with a win in the HEW Cyclassics in front of Tour runner-up Jan Ullrich, and a win in the Clásica de San Sebastián.

Bettini failed to win the UCI Road Cycling World Championship despite being favorite due to a mistake at the end of the race.  Having established himself in the winning breakaway, hesitation allowed the Spaniard Igor Astarloa to break away to win.  Astarloa claimed that Bettini had offered him money to relinquish the win, which Astarloa said he refused.  A feud ensued, and Astarloa attributed his comment to a misunderstanding of Bettini's Italian.

2004 World Cup and race season

The 2004 season started well with Milan–San Remo, but Davide Rebellin won the La Flèche Wallonne (not in the World Cup), Liège–Bastogne–Liège and Amstel Gold Race.  Bettini's disappointments continued with second places in the HEW Cyclassics, which he had won previously, and in the Clásica de San Sebastián, which he had won the previous year.  The points gained in Paris–Tours put him in the leader's jersey, but with the last race the Giro di Lombardia better suited to Rebellin, the World Cup was not yet safe. Bettini followed Rebellin throughout the race, resulting in Rebellin's quitting in frustration.

Bettini's most important victory was the 2004 Summer Olympics, where he broke away with Portuguese Sérgio Paulinho for a comfortable victory decided on a last moment sprint with both. He again failed to win the world championship due to an injury when he banged his knee against the team car at the beginning of the race.

2005 UCI ProTour and race season
After Milan–San Remo, Bettini had an injury-marked start which prevented significant participation in the spring classics, and he had no victories until he got two stage wins at the 2005 Giro d'Italia, where he wore the pink jersey as leader of the general classification for several days. After that, no more good results until the 2005 Vuelta a España, where he beat Alessandro Petacchi in an uphill sprint in Valladolid. After that, he took part in the world championship in Madrid, where he got into the decisive break but did not get a medal. A week later, he won Züri-Metzgete for a second time.  Two weeks later he won the Giro di Lombardia as well.

2006 UCI ProTour and race season

Bettini won the first race of the season, the Trofeo Soller, which is part of the Challenge Mallorca. He also won the Gran Premio di Lugano, two stages in the Tirreno–Adriatico and the 15th stage in the Giro d'Italia, where he won the points classification. Following the Giro he became the Italian road champion and won a stage at the Vuelta a España before winning the world championship.

His brother Sauro died in a car accident a few days after that victory and Bettini was close to abandoning cycling. He changed his mind and won the Giro di Lombardia in tears.

On 2 March 2007, the French magazine Velo awarded Bettini its Vélo d'Or as best rider of 2006.

2007 UCI ProTour and race season
Bettini raced in the second annual 2.HC-rated 2007 Tour of California and made it worth his while by capturing Stage 4 in a sprint finish. He later won the third stage of the Vuelta a España and finished second in three more stages. Then he won once again the rainbow jersey of the Elite Men's Road at Stuttgart.

2008 season

Bettini's start was plagued by injuries, including a fall at the Kuurne–Brussels–Kuurne and a rib broken when he fell on a wet descent in the Tour of the Basque Country. He won the Trofeo Matteoti and stages at the Tour of Austria and Tour de Wallonie. He also won two stages at the Vuelta a España, where he said he was leaving Quick Step after 10 years due to a financial dispute.
On September 27 he announced his retirement.
On 4 November, he fell during the Milan six-day and was taken to hospital unconscious.

Coaching career
On 17 June 2010, Bettini was named as the new Italian national coach, following the death of Franco Ballerini in a car accident earlier that year. He left this role in 2014 to work with Fernando Alonso on his new cycling team in preparation for its launch in 2015.

Track racing
Bettini followed the path of riders before the 1970s and took up six-day racing in the winter. He rode at Munich and Grenoble in 2006. "I didn't do it for the money", he said. "I had that already. I did it through my love of racing, to see what it's like to race on a track." The bankings proved trickier than the road, however, and his debut was described as "catastrophic" as he failed to get alongside his partner in the two-man relay race, the madison, and finished the first night "with fear in his face." Charly Mottet said:

I saw him at the start of the evening and he worried me. Two hours later, I can tell you, he had won the respect of the others. He was making proper changes, he was taking part in the race and he was going better and better. The others couldn't believe their eyes [commencaient à ne plus voir le jour].

Personal life
Bettini married Monica Orlandini, a literature teacher, in 2000. They moved into a farmhouse belonging to his wife's family, who have been olive farmers for four generations. They live in Riparbella, 10 km from Cecina, where Bettini was born.

Career achievements

Major results

1996
 1st Stage 8 Giro Ciclistico d'Italia
 3rd Road race, National Under-23 Road Championships
 4th Road race, UCI Road World Under-23 Championships
 9th Overall Grand Prix Guillaume Tell
1997
 1st Stage 2 (TTT) Hofbrau Cup
 8th Overall Tour de Langkawi
1998
 1st Stage 4a Tour de Romandie
 3rd Trofeo Laigueglia
 3rd Gran Premio Bruno Beghelli
 7th Overall Giro d'Italia
 7th Overall Danmark Rundt
1st  Mountains classification
 7th Giro della Provincia di Reggio Calabria
 8th Overall Tour Méditerranéen
 8th Züri-Metzgete
 8th Coppa Sabatini
1999
 1st  Overall Giro della Provincia di Lucca
1st Stage 1
 1st Stage 4 Tirreno–Adriatico
 2nd Milano–Torino
 3rd Overall Settimana Internazionale di Coppi e Bartali
1st Stage 2 
 4th Züri-Metzgete
 5th Liège–Bastogne–Liège
 6th Overall Tour of Galicia
1st Stage 1 
 7th GP Ouest–France
 7th Giro dell'Appennino
 9th Giro di Lombardia
 9th Grand Prix of Aargau Canton
2000
 1st  Overall Memorial Cecchi Gori
1st Stages 2 & 4
 1st Liège–Bastogne–Liège
 1st Trofeo Manacor
 1st Stage 9 Tour de France
 2nd Giro della Romagna
 4th Clásica de San Sebastián
 4th Paris–Tours
 5th Coppa Placci
 7th Grand Prix de Fourmies
 7th Giro della Provincia di Siracusa
 9th Road race, Olympic Games
 9th Road race, UCI Road World Championships
 10th Giro di Lombardia
 10th Trofeo Pantalica
 10th GP Industria & Artigianato di Larciano
2001
 1st Züri–Metzgete
 1st Coppa Placci
 2nd Overall Tour de Langkawi
1st  Points classification 
1st Stages 3 & 11
 2nd  Road race, UCI Road World Championships
 3rd Coppa Sabatini
 4th Overall Giro della Provincia di Lucca
1st Stage 4 
 5th Milan–San Remo
 5th Tre Valli Varesine
 5th Giro del Lazio
 6th HEW Cyclassics
 9th Firenze–Pistoia
2002
 1st  Overall UCI Road World Cup
 1st  Overall Tour de Wallonie
1st Stage 1
 1st  Overall Giro Riviera Ligure Pomente
1st Stage 3 & 4
 1st Liège–Bastogne–Liège
 1st Coppa Sabatini
 1st Giro del Lazio
 1st Stage 1 Tour Méditerranéen
 1st Stage 3 Giro della Provincia di Lucca
 2nd Züri–Metzgete
 2nd Giro di Toscana
 4th Overall Tirreno–Adriatico
1st Stage 2 
 4th E3 Prijs Vlaanderen
 4th HEW Cyclassics
 5th Omloop Het Volk
 6th Gran Premio Industria e Commercio di Prato
 7th Clásica de San Sebastián
 7th Firenze–Pistoia
 8th Amstel Gold Race
 8th Trofeo Laigueglia
 10th Coppa Placci
2003
 1st  Overall UCI Road World Cup
 1st  Road race, National Road Championships
 1st  Overall Tour Méditerranéen
1st  Points classification 
 1st Milan–San Remo
 1st Clásica de San Sebastián
 1st HEW Cyclassics
 2nd Grand Prix of Aargau Canton
 3rd Omloop Het Volk
 3rd Züri–Metzgete
 4th Road race, UCI Road World Championships
 4th Trofeo Laigueglia
 4th Gran Premio della Costa Etruschi
 4th Trofeo Alcúdia
 5th Overall Tirreno–Adriatico
1st  Points classification
 5th Tour du Haut Var
 5th Gran Premio Città di Camaiore
 5th Trofeo Manacor
 8th Giro dell'Emilia
2004
 1st  Overall UCI Road World Cup
 1st  Road race, Olympic Games
 1st  Overall Tirreno–Adriatico
1st Stage 4 & 6
 1st Gran Premio Città di Camaiore
 1st Stage 8 Tour de Suisse
 2nd Clásica de San Sebastián
 2nd HEW Cyclassics
 2nd Kuurne–Brussels–Kuurne
 2nd Züri–Metzgete
 3rd Amstel Gold Race
 5th Paris–Brussels
 5th Trofeo Palma de Mallorca
 6th Overall Tour Méditerranéen
1st Stage 2 
 6th Paris–Tours
 8th Milan–San Remo
 8th Ronde van Midden-Zeeland
 9th Overall Circuit Franco-Belge
1st Stage 1 
 9th Tour of Flanders
2005
 1st Giro di Lombardia
 1st Züri–Metzgete
 Giro d'Italia
1st  Points classification
1st Stage 1
 1st Stage 16 Vuelta a España
 2nd Gran Premio Bruno Beghelli
 4th Liège–Bastogne–Liège
 7th Trofeo Palma de Mallorca
2006
 1st  Road race, UCI Road World Championships
 1st  Road race, National Road Championships
 1st Giro di Lombardia
 1st Gran Premio di Lugano
 1st Trofeo Sóller
 Giro d'Italia
1st  Points classification
1st Stage 15
 1st Stage 2 Vuelta a España
 Tirreno–Adriatico
1st Stage 1 & 2
 2nd Liège–Bastogne–Liège
 3rd Trofeo Pollença
 3rd Trofeo Cala Millor
 7th Tour of Flanders
 8th Amstel Gold Race
 9th Trofeo Laigueglia
 9th Trofeo Palma de Mallorca
2007
 1st  Road race, UCI Road World Championships
 1st Stage 3 Vuelta a España
 1st Stage 4 Tour of California
 4th Liège–Bastogne–Liège
 6th Amstel Gold Race
 7th Vattenfall Cyclassics
 7th Firenze–Pistoia
2008
 1st Trofeo Matteotti
 Vuelta a España
1st Stage 6 & 12
 1st Stage 1 Tour of Austria
 3rd Overall Tour de Wallonie
1st Stage 2
 4th Clásica de San Sebastián
 9th Liège–Bastogne–Liège

Grand Tour general classification results timeline

Monuments results

See also
 Italian men gold medalist at the Olympics and World Championships

References

External links
 

Italian male cyclists
Italian Tour de France stage winners
Italian Vuelta a España stage winners
Italian Giro d'Italia stage winners
UCI Road World Champions (elite men)
Olympic cyclists of Italy
Olympic gold medalists for Italy
Sportspeople from the Province of Livorno
Cyclists at the 2000 Summer Olympics
Cyclists at the 2004 Summer Olympics
Cyclists at the 2008 Summer Olympics
1974 births
Living people
Tour de Suisse stage winners
Olympic medalists in cycling
Medalists at the 2004 Summer Olympics
UCI Road World Cup winners
UCI Road World Rankings winners
People from Cecina, Tuscany
Cyclists from Tuscany